Larry Reithmaier (May 28, 1921 – January 31, 2015) was an American engineer and author. "Private Pilot's Guide" won the top award presented by the Aviation/Space Writers Association for excellence in writing on the subject of general aviation in 1974.  Larry graduated from the University of Illinois in 1944 with a Bachelor of Science in Mechanical Engineering. During a long career as an aerospace engineer, Larry worked on the design and development of the F2H, F-3, F-86H, F-100, F-101, and F-4 fighter planes, the B-1B bomber, and Apollo and Skylab spacecraft. He also held various licenses for flying including commercial pilot rating, instrument rating, instructor rating and mechanic rating. Larry is included in the 1982 editions of Who's Who in California, Who's Who in the West, and Who's Who in Aviation and Aerospace. Beginning in 1985, Larry was listed in Who's Who in America.

Selected publications
Standard Aircraft Handbook for Mechanics and Technicians 
Aviation Mechanics Certification Guide 
Aircraft Mechanics Digest 
Aircraft Mechanics Shop Manual 
Aircraft Repair Manual 
Aviation-Space Dictionary 
Computer Guide for Pilots 
Controlling Pilot Error: Maintenance & Mechanics 
Flight Planning Guide for Pilots 
Instrument Pilots Guide 
Mach 1 and Beyond: The Illustrated Guide to High-Speed Flight 
Pilot's Handbook of Weather 
Private Pilots Guide 
Radar Guide for Pilots 
Weather Briefing Guide for Pilots 

Writers from Chicago
American aerospace engineers
American mechanical engineers
1921 births
2015 deaths
Engineers from Illinois
Commercial aviators
University of Illinois alumni